The Papua New Guinea women's national rugby union team played their first international against Fiji in 2016. They compete annually in the Oceania Rugby Women's Championship, and have not qualified for the Rugby World Cup as yet.

History

Papua New Guinea played their first international test match at the inaugural 2016 Oceania Rugby Women's Championship against Fiji. The tournament was also part of the qualifying process for the 2017 Women's Rugby World Cup. Fiji won the match 37–10 and progressed to the Repechage tournament.

The Palais competed at the 2018 Oceania Championships and finished last overall, Samoa and Tonga had joined the competition for the first time.

At the 2019 Oceania Championships in Fiji, the Palais played Samoa and a Black Ferns Development XV's team. They also played a consolation match against a Fijiana Development XV's team because the main team would be playing in a qualifier against Samoa for the 2021 Rugby World Cup. The 2019 tournament had to be restructured to cater for the Tongan team due to a measles outbreak in their country.

In 2020 Papua New Guinea hosted Tonga at Port Moresby in a repechage qualifier for the 2021 World Cup. It was the first women's test match to be played in the country. Tonga defeated PNG 36–24 and went on to meet Samoa for the repechage playoff.

Nickname change 
Papua New Guinea changed their nickname from Palais, which is Tok Pisin for lizard, to Cassowaries because of sponsorship restrictions. The nickname comes from the Cassowary, a flightless bird that is regarded as the world’s most dangerous bird.

Results
See Women's international rugby for information about the status of international games and match numbering

Overall record
Summary of all full international matches:

Full internationals

Other internationals

Squad

Recent squad 
Papua New Guinea's squad to 2022 Oceania Rugby Championship.

See also
Papua New Guinea women's national rugby sevens team
Oceania Rugby Women's Championship

References

External links
 Papua New Guinea on IRB.com
 Papua New Guinea on Rugbydata.com

Oceanian national women's rugby union teams
Rugby union in Papua New Guinea
W